The Fes Railway station is the main station in the Moroccan city of  Fes. There are secondary stations for local connections, but this is the station used for the long-distance main-line trains.

Rail network

Fes lies on the east–west mainline in Northern Morocco and offers direct connections with Oujda and Nador in the East, Tangier in the North and via transfer at Meknes, the main North-West line to Rabat, Casablanca and Marrakech.

Electrification
A part of the Moroccan mainline network is electrified. On the West to East mainline Fes is the endpoint of the electrified tracks. The trains going to and from Taourirt, Oujda and Nador are powered with diesel-locomotives while trains from the west terminating in Fes or going to Tanger use electric locomotives.

Connections

From Nador there are 4 trains per day calling at Fes and the same applies to Oujda. One of the daily trains to/from Oujda is a so-called hoteltrain that offers only couchette places, and with couchette tickets available on all night-trains. Traveltimes from Fes to Nador is approximately 6 hours, and to Oujda approximately 5.5 hours.

The section Fes-Meknes-Rabat and further to Casablanca is by far the busiest long-distance 
Het traject, with 18 daily trains, of which 8 continue from Casablanca to Marrakech. The journey to Marrakech railway station takes 8.5 hours

Modernising
The Office National des Chemins de Fer or ONCF, the state-company operating the railways invests a lot of money and effort to modernize the network. The stations of Marrakech and Fes have been (re)built in the past years, the branch-line Taourirt-Nador was built between 2006 and 2009. And around the city of Meknes a bypass is constructed so that a part of the trains can bypass Meknes

Also a high-speed track is being built between Tangier-Casablanca is being constructed, see Kenitra–Tangier high-speed rail line but this train won't call at Fes

References

External links
ONCF.ma

Railway stations in Morocco
Railway stations opened in 2009
railway
21st-century architecture in Morocco